Yacine Merabi (born 7 August 1966) is the Algerian Minister of Vocational Education and Training Professionals. He was appointed as minister on 9 September 2022.

Education 
Merabi holds a Diploma in Pholosophy (1990), a Magister in Philosophy (2009) and a Doctor of Philosophy from the Oran 1 University.

References 

Living people
21st-century Algerian politicians
Algerian politicians
Government ministers of Algeria
Year of birth missing (living people)

University of Oran alumni